Chitamanpur is a village in West Champaran district in the Indian state of Bihar.

Demographics
As of 2011 India census, Chitamanpur had a population of 871 in 125 households. Males constitute 53.61% of the population and females 46.38%. Chitamanpur has an average literacy rate of 46.38%, lower than the national average of 74%: male literacy is 60.14%, and female literacy is 39.85%. In Chitamanpur, 21.23% of the population is under 6 years of age.

References

Villages in West Champaran district